"The Monster Song" is the first single from Psapp's The Camel's Back.  It was released on November 3, 2008 in the UK, a week after the parent album became available.  At this time, a US release of the single has not been announced.

A video of the title track was released in advance of the album and single.

Track listing

Personnel

Carim Clasmann
Galia Durant

External links
Psapp official website 
The Monster Song at Domino Records
Psapp at Domino Records
The Monster Song Review

2008 singles
Psapp songs
2008 songs
Domino Recording Company singles